Nambitha Mpumlwana (born 12 February 1967) is a South African actress, presenter, producer and niece to Loyiso Mpumlwana. She's known for her role as Mawande Memela in SABC 1's soapie, Generations. She was also cast in e.tv's Ashes to Ashes as Mandlakazi and was also an actress In a South Africa Film Tsotsi.

Early life
She was born in the Eastern Cape.

Career
Mpumlwana's career began as a continuity presenter for SABC before joining the SABC2 wildlife show 50/50 as a presenter. she also presented the SABC2 shows Lebone and Practical Parenting, as well as the SABC3 show Money. She has appeared in several films such as Tsotsi, Red Dust as well as Country Of My Skull. She gained recognition when she joined the popular SABC1 soapie, “Generations” in 2011, playing the role of ”Mawande Memela” who is a mother of two and a business woman who goes through family matters and after losing it with her daughter, she got poisoned by her daughter and lost her mind. The drama kept unfolding. .
She also had a role on 7de laan.

Awards and nominations
She won the Golden Horn Award for her role of Pearl Lusipho in the drama series The Lab.

Filmography

Films

Television

References

External links

1967 births
People from Mthatha
Living people
South African television actresses